Miguel Martínez González  is a Spanish football fitness coach and football coach and PhD holder in Physical Education. On 3 October 2016 Martinez to took over the side as they took on Mumbai City as their head coach, Antonio López Habas, was suspended for four matches.

Career
Martínez is a PhD holder in physical education from University of Vigo and in his career he worked as fitness and rehab coach and also work as football coach different clubs.

Managerial statistics
.

References

Living people
Year of birth missing (living people)
People from O Baixo Miño
Sportspeople from the Province of Pontevedra
Spanish football managers
FC Pune City managers
Spanish expatriate football managers
Spanish expatriate sportspeople in India
Expatriate football managers in India